This is a list of United States ambassadors to Mongolia. The United States established diplomatic relations with then-People's Republic of Mongolia on January 27, 1987. The embassy in Ulaanbaatar was opened Apr 17, 1988, with Steven Mann as Chargé d'Affaires ad interim. Richard Llewellyn Williams was the first ambassador to the Republic, and resided in the District of Columbia. The current Mongolian ambassador to the United States is Batbayar Ulziidelger, who succeeded Otgonbayar Yondon when he presented credentials on December 1, 2021. The U.S. maintains its embassy in Ulaanbaatar.

Ambassadors

See also
Mongolia – United States relations
Foreign relations of Mongolia
Ambassadors of the United States

References

United States Department of State: Background notes on Mongolia

External links
 United States Department of State: Chiefs of Mission for Mongolia
 United States Department of State: Mongolia
 United States Embassy in Ulaanbaatar

Mongolia

United States